Ice pigging is the process in which an ice slurry is pumped into a pipe and forced along inside in order to remove sediment and other unwanted deposits to leave the pipe clean. It has many applications in the water, sewage and food industries. Ice pigging was invented and first patented by Professor Joe Quarini of the University of Bristol.

Process 

Ice pigging has the benefits of solid conventional pigging, but without the associated drawbacks; the Ice Pig can flow like a liquid through obstructions such as changes in diameter and valves, and it can be inserted and ejected from the pipe using small diameter fittings. If an Ice Pig does become stuck it can be left to melt and flushed out after a few hours.

The process can be undertaken on all pipe materials, on diameters from 8mm to 600mm, and on lengths of several kilometres. The ice pigging process takes less time than traditional pigging methods for underground pipes and can be operated by fewer people reducing labor costs.

Minimal enabling works are required to insert the ice and remove it, this gives the benefits of not only less water supply disruption but also less traffic disruption for enabling works.

Any water flushing methods (such as uni-directional flushing, air/water flushing or closed loop with sidestream filtration) are limited by the fact that as water flows through pipework, a boundary layer of slower flow occurs at the pipe surface, so the wall shear generated is small, even at flushing velocities of several metres per second. Because the ice pig moves through the pipework like a solid object, movement is concentrated at the pipe wall generating high wall shear even at velocities as low as 0.2m/sec.

Environmental impacts 

Ice pigging uses less water and requires less cleanup than traditional flushing or underground pipe pigging techniques. A significant amount of energy is required in the manufacture of the ice slurry, however this can be mitigated by using a renewable power source.

Research and development 

The University of Bristol have produced a paper entitled "Investigation and development of an innovative pigging technique for the water supply industry." in which they have detailed the research that they have carried out. It looks particularly at how the properties of the ice pig behave with different ice fractions and varied levels of particulate loading as well as looking into the effects of shear strength, viscosity and heat transfer characteristics.

Process 
 Ice slurry is inserted into the pipe via an existing small diameter fitting
 Ice pigging doesn't require expensive excavation or preliminary treatment because it can be inserted into a pipe through existing access points whatever their diameter and then expand to the size required. Likewise the ice will exit the pipe with ease through any fire hydrant.
 Ice pigging uses less water than traditional pipe cleaning methods. The Pig is pushed through the pipe using just one pipe volume of water and then the pipe is flushed for a short period returning the water quality to its usual limits typically using 1/4 to 1/2 of the pipe volume, Total water usage is therefore typically 1.5 times the volume of the pipe to be cleaned.
 The ice pigging process can be used in pipes of any material and will not damage the internal structure of the pipe.
 The ice pigging process takes less time than traditional pigging methods for underground pipes and can be operated by fewer people reducing labour costs.
 Ice pigging is a low risk technique and minimal enabling works are required to insert the ice and remove it.
 Ice pigging in manufacturing can reduce effluent costs and provide product recovery benefits, when compared to water flushing.

References

Further reading 
 G.S.F. Shire, G.L. Quarini, T.D.L.Rhys, T.S. Evans (2008). "The anomalous pressure drop behaviour of ice slurries flowing through constrictions".
 G.L. Quarini (2011). "Thermal Hydraulic performance of ice pigging in narrow tubes".
 G.L. Quarini, E. Ainslie, M. Herbert, T. Deans, Dom Ash, T.D.L. Rhys, N. Haskins, G. Norton, S. Andrews, M. Smith. "Investigation and development of an innovative pigging technique for the water supply industry".
 J.W.Meewisse and C.A.Infante Ferreira. "Freezing point depression of various ice slurries".
 J. Bellas, I. Chaer, S.A. Tassou (2002). "Heat transfer and pressure drop of ice slurries in plate heat exchangers".

Water
Drinking water
Water industry